Teresa Guadalupe "Lupita" Worbis Aguilar (born 12 December 1983) is a Mexican architect and a footballer who plays as a midfielder for Liga MX Femenil club Puebla. She has been a member of the Mexico women's national team.

Early life
Worbis completed her undergraduate degree in architecture at the Monterrey Institute of Technology and Higher Education in Puebla, Mexico.

Club career
On 11 January 2013 Worbis joined Washington Spirit for the inaugural season of the National Women's Soccer League as part of the NWSL Player Allocation. She made eleven appearances for the Spirit and scored one goal.

International career
Worbis competed for Mexico at the 2004 Summer Olympics in Athens, Greece, where the team finished in 8th place.

References

External links
 
 Teresa "Lupita" Worbis at Washington Spirit
 
 
 
 
 

1983 births
Living people
Mexican women architects
21st-century Mexican architects
Women's association football midfielders
Women's association football forwards
Mexican women's footballers
Footballers from Yucatán
People from Mérida, Yucatán
Mexican people of German descent
Mexico women's international footballers
FIFA Century Club
2011 FIFA Women's World Cup players
Olympic footballers of Mexico
Footballers at the 2004 Summer Olympics
Pan American Games bronze medalists for Mexico
Pan American Games medalists in football
Footballers at the 2003 Pan American Games
Footballers at the 2011 Pan American Games
Footballers at the 2007 Pan American Games
National Women's Soccer League players
Washington Spirit players
Mexican expatriate women's footballers
Mexican expatriate sportspeople in Spain
Expatriate women's footballers in Spain
Mexican expatriate sportspeople in the United States
Expatriate women's soccer players in the United States
Medalists at the 2011 Pan American Games
Medalists at the 2003 Pan American Games
Liga MX Femenil players
Mexican footballers